Ian Richard Hodder  (born 23 November 1948, in Bristol) is a British archaeologist and pioneer of postprocessualist theory in archaeology that first took root among his students and in his own work between 1980–1990. At this time he had such students as Henrietta Moore, Ajay Pratap, Nandini Rao, Mike Parker Pearson, Paul Lane, John Muke, Sheena Crawford, Nick Merriman, Michael Shanks and Christopher Tilley. , he is Dunlevie Family Professor of Anthropology at Stanford University in the United States.

Early life and education
Hodder was born on 23 November 1948 in Bristol, England, to Professor Bramwell William "Dick" Hodder and his wife Noreen Victoria Hodder. He was brought up in Singapore and in Oxford, England. He was educated at Magdalen College School, Oxford, then an all-boys private school.

He studied prehistoric archaeology at the Institute of Archaeology of the University of London, graduating with a first class Bachelor of Arts (BA) in 1971. He then studied at Peterhouse, Cambridge, and was awarded a Doctor of Philosophy (PhD) degree by the University of Cambridge in 1975: his supervisor was David L. Clarke and his thesis was titled "Some Applications of Spatial Analysis in Archaeology".

Academic career
He was a lecturer at the University of Leeds from 1974 to 1977. He then returned to the University of Cambridge, where he was an assistant lecturer (1977 to 1981) and then lecturer (1981 to 1990) in archaeology. From 1990 to 2000, he was director of the Cambridge Archaeological Unit and a Fellow of Darwin College, Cambridge. The university appointed him Reader in Prehistory in 1990 and Professor of Archaeology in 1996.

In 1999, Hodder moved to Stanford University in the United States. He became Dunlevie Family Professor in 2002.

Since 1993, Hodder and an international team of archaeologists have carried out new research and excavation of the 9,000-year-old Neolithic site of Çatalhöyük in central Anatolia (modern Turkey). He is Director of the Çatalhöyük Archaeological Project which aims to conserve the site, put it into context, and present it to the public. He has endeavoured to explore the effects of non-positivistic methods in archaeology, which includes providing each excavator with the opportunity to record his or her own individual interpretation of the site.

He was elected a Fellow of the British Academy (FBA) in 1996. In the 2019 Queen's Birthday Honours he was appointed Companion of the Order of St Michael and St George (CMG) for services to archaeology and UK/Turkey relations.

Selected publications
Spatial analysis in archaeology (1976, with C. Orton)
Symbols in action. Ethnoarchaeological studies of material culture (1982)
The Present Past. An introduction to anthropology for archaeologists (1982)
Symbolic and Structural Archaeology (1982)
Reading the Past. Current approaches to interpretation in archaeology (1986) (revised 1991 and, with Scott Hutson, 2003)
The Domestication of Europe: Structure and contingency in Neolithic societies (1990)
Theory and Practice in Archaeology (1992) (Collected papers)
On the Surface: Çatalhöyük 1993–95 (1996), as editor, Cambridge:  McDonald Institute for Archaeological Research and British Institute of Archaeology at Ankara.  .
The Archaeological Process. An introduction (1999)
Archaeological Theory Today (2001)
Archaeology beyond dialogue (2004) (Collected papers)
The Leopard's Tale: Revealing the Mysteries of Çatalhöyük (2006)
Religion in the Emergence of Civilization. Çatalhöyük as a case study (2010)
Entangled: An Archaeology of the Relationships between Humans and Things (2012)
Where Are We Heading? The Evolution of Humans and Things (2018)

References

Further reading
 Balter, Michael. The Goddess and the Bull: Çatalhöyük: An Archaeological Journey to the Dawn of Civilization. New York: Free Press, 2004 (hardcover); Walnut Creek, CA: Left Coast Press, 2006 (paperback).
 Kerig, Tim. Ian Hodder und die britische Archäologie. In: M. K. H. Eggert & U. Veit (Eds.): Theorien in der Archäologie: Zur englischsprachigen Diskussion. Tübinger Archaeologische Taschenbucher 1. p. 217-242. Münster: Waxmann 1998 (paperback ).

External links
Home page for Ian Hodder
Home page at Stanford University, Department of Anthropology
Home page at Stanford Archaeology Center
Interview  with the Society for California Archaeology in 1999
 Interview with Ian Hodder March 2017 "Ian Hodder: Çatalhöyük, Religion & Templeton’s 25%"

1948 births
Living people
British archaeologists
Academics from Bristol
Alumni of the University of London
Academics of the University of Leeds
Academics of the University of Cambridge
Alumni of Peterhouse, Cambridge
Fellows of the British Academy
Companions of the Order of St Michael and St George
Fellows of Darwin College, Cambridge
People educated at Magdalen College School, Oxford